The 2015 Derry Senior Hurling Championship was the 70th edition of the Derry GAA's premier hurling tournament for senior clubs in Derry club hurling competitions. The winners receive the Fr Collins Cup.

Slaughtneil Robert Emmet's were the defending champions, having beaten Kevin Lynch's 2–11 to 2–9 in the 2014 final. They won their third championship in a row by beating Swatragh 5–26 to 1–5 in the final on 20 September 2015.

Quarter-finals

Semi-finals

Final

Ulster Senior Club Hurling Championship

Derry
Derry Senior Hurling Championship